Harald Bjorvand (born 30 July 1942) is a Norwegian linguist.

He was born in Askim, and graduated from the University of Oslo in 1970. He was a research fellow at the same institution from 1972 to 1974, amanuensis from 1974 to 1987, associate professor from 1987 and professor from 1990. He took the dr.philos. degree in 1988 with the thesis Holt og Holtar. Om utviklingen av det indoeuropeiske kollektivum i norrønt på sammenlignende grunnlag.

His fields of specialty are general comparative language history, general Indo-Germanic linguistics, all archaic Germanic languages (Old West Norse, Gothic, Old High German etc.), and Germanic linguistics in general, including runes, morphology and etymology.

His most famous work is a new etymological dictionary (Våre Arveord "Our inherited words") for Norwegian, which is a collaboration with Fredrik Otto Lindeman, another linguist professor in the Indo-Germanic field.

References 

1942 births
Living people
Linguists from Norway
University of Oslo alumni
Academic staff of the University of Oslo
Germanists
Linguists of Germanic languages
Linguists of Indo-European languages
People from Askim
Runologists